James Ahkello Elec Witherspoon (born March 21, 1995) is an American football cornerback for the Pittsburgh Steelers of the National Football League (NFL). He played college football at Colorado.

High school career
Witherspoon attended Christian Brothers High School in Sacramento, California. He played only one season of football in high school.

College career
Witherspoon played at Sacramento City College for one year before transferring to the University of Colorado Boulder. He played at Colorado from  2014 to 2016. During his career, he had 71 tackles and three interceptions.

Professional career
Coming out of Colorado, Witherspoon was projected to be a second or third round pick by the majority of NFL draft experts and scouts. He received an invitation to the NFL Combine and performed nearly every combine drill, but opted to skip the bench press. On March 8, 2017, he chose to participate at Colorado's pro day long with, Chidobe Awuzie, Tedric Thompson, Sefo Liufau, and ten other prospects. All 32 NFL teams had team representatives and scouts present. He had five private workouts and visits with the Indianapolis Colts, New Orleans Saints, Philadelphia Eagles, San Francisco 49ers, and Seattle Seahawks. He was ranked the 14th best cornerback prospect in the draft by NFLDraftScout.com.

San Francisco 49ers
The San Francisco 49ers selected Witherspoon in the third round (66th overall) of the 2017 NFL Draft. He was the 11th cornerback selected in the 2017 NFL Draft.

2017 season: Rookie year

On May 12, 2017, the San Francisco 49ers signed Witherspoon to a four-year, $3.88 million contract with a signing bonus of $973,572.

Witherspoon competed with Dontae Johnson, Rashard Robinson, Keith Reaser, and K'Waun Williams throughout training camp for the starting cornerback position. Head coach Kyle Shanahan named him the fifth cornerback on the depth chart behind Dontae Johnson, Rashard Robinson, K'Waun Williams, and Asa Jackson.

Witherspoon was a healthy scratch for the first four games of the year. On October 8, 2017, he made his NFL debut and recorded one tackle during a 23-26 overtime road loss to the Indianapolis Colts. On October 29, 2017, Witherspoon earned his first NFL start and recorded three solo tackles, a pass deflection, and picked off a pass attempt by Carson Wentz for his first NFL interception as the 49ers lost to the Philadelphia Eagles by a score of 10-33. Witherspoon earned the start in place of Rashard Robinson who was benched after repetitive penalties and then traded to the New York Jets, two days later. Head coach Kyle Shanahan stated that Witherspoon would be the starting cornerback, opposite Dontae Johnson, moving forward and his development was one of the key factors in trading Robinson. Pro Football Focus graded Witherspoon the best player on the San Francisco 49ers during the matchup against the Eagles and credited him with allowing three receptions on eight targets. During a Week 16 matchup against the Jacksonville Jaguars, Witherspoon recorded his second interception of the year by picking off Blake Bortles as the 49ers won by a score of 44-33.

Witherspoon finished his rookie year playing in 12 games with nine starts, recording 32 tackles, seven passes defended, and two interceptions.

2018 season
Witherspoon entered the 2018 season as a starting cornerback alongside Richard Sherman. He played in 14 games with 12 starts, recording 37 tackles and four passes defended. On December 18, 2018, Witherspoon was placed on injured reserve due to a knee injury he suffered in Week 15 against the Seattle Seahawks.

2019 season
In the season-opener against the Tampa Bay Buccaneers, Witherspoon intercepted Jameis Winston and returned it 25 yards for a touchdown in the 31-17 road victory. He missed Weeks 5-10 with a foot injury but returned in Week 11 against the Arizona Cardinals.

Witherspoon finished the regular season with 28 tackles, a career-high nine pass deflections, and an interception returned for a touchdown. In the playoffs, he was demoted to a backup role to Emmanuel Moseley after a poor performance in the Divisional Round against the Minnesota Vikings. The 49ers went on to reach Super Bowl LIV, but lost 31-20 to the Kansas City Chiefs. Witherspoon finished the Super Bowl with one tackle.

2020 season
In Week 16 against the Arizona Cardinals, Witherspoon recorded his first interception of the season off a pass thrown by Kyler Murray during the 20–12 win.

Seattle Seahawks
On March 19, 2021, Witherspoon signed a one-year contract with the Seattle Seahawks.

Pittsburgh Steelers
Witherspoon was traded to the Pittsburgh Steelers for a 2023 fifth-round draft pick on September 3, 2021. In Week 14 Witherspoon had 4 tackles and intercepted Kirk Cousins twice in a 36-28 loss to the Minnesota Vikings.

On March 25, 2022, Witherspoon signed a two-year contract extension with the Steelers. He was named a starting cornerback for the Steelers alongside Cameron Sutton. He started the first three games before suffering a hamstring injury in Week 3. He missed seven of the next eight games before being placed on injured reserve on December 3, 2022.

NFL career statistics

Regular season

Postseason

Personal life
Witherspoon is the grandson of bluesman Jimmy Witherspoon.

References

External links
San Francisco 49ers bio
Colorado Buffaloes bio

1995 births
Living people
Players of American football from Sacramento, California
American football cornerbacks
Sacramento City Panthers football players
Colorado Buffaloes football players
San Francisco 49ers players
Seattle Seahawks players
Pittsburgh Steelers players